The United Arab Emirates cricket team toured Oman in February 2022 to play three One Day International (ODI) matches at the Oman Cricket Academy Ground in Muscat. The fixtures formed part of the 2019–2023 ICC Cricket World Cup League 2 tournament, and were arranged to make up for matches between the two sides that were previously postponed during the fourth and eighth rounds of the competition.

Oman's Jatinder Singh (106) scored a century in the first match, but Chirag Suri (115) led the visitors to a four-wicket victory. The second match was also won by the UAE, again by four wickets, with Basil Hameed taking a five-wicket haul. The third and final match ended as a tie, with the UAE winning the series 2–0.

After the ODI series, both sides participated in a Twenty20 International (T20I) quadrangular series and the T20 World Cup Global Qualifier A.

Squads

ODI series

1st ODI

2nd ODI

3rd ODI

References

External links
 Series home at ESPN Cricinfo

2022 in Omani cricket
2022 in Emirati cricket
International cricket competitions in 2021–22
Oman